Aid climbing is a style of climbing in which standing on or pulling oneself up via devices attached to fixed or placed protection is used to make upward progress.

The term contrasts with free climbing in which progress is made without using artificial aids: a free climber ascends by only holding onto and stepping on natural features of the rock, using rope and equipment merely to catch them in case of fall and provide belay. 

In general, aid techniques are reserved for pitches where free climbing is difficult to impossible, and  extremely steep and long routes demanding great endurance and both physical and mental stamina.  While aid climbing places less emphasis on athletic fitness and raw strength than free climbing, the physical demands of hard aid climbing should not be underestimated.

In early versions of the Yosemite Decimal System, aid climbing was class 6, but today the YDS uses only classes 1-5.  Aid climbing has its own ranking system, using a separate scale from A0 through A6.

Technique

In a typical ascent with aid the climber places pieces of equipment called protection in cracks or other natural features of the rock, then clips a ladder-like device, called an aider, stirrup or étrier, to the protection, stands up on the aider, and repeats the process.

Just as in free climbing, the usual aid technique involves two climbers, the leader and belayer.  The leader is connected by a rope to the belayer, who remains at the belay station while the leader moves up.  As the leader advances, the rope is let out by the belayer, and clipped by the leader into the pieces of protection as they are placed.  If the leader falls, the belayer locks off the rope and, assuming the protection doesn't pull out, catches the leader's fall on the rope.  When the leader, moving up, reaches the end of the rope, or a convenient stopping point, they build an anchor, hang on it, and affix the rope to it.  This then becomes the next belay station.  The belayer then ascends the fixed rope using mechanical ascenders, retrieving the protection that was placed by the leader.  Meanwhile, the leader sets up a hauling system and, using another rope brought up for that purpose, hauls up a bag containing the climbers' food, water, hammocks or porta-ledge, sleeping bags, and so on.  Many variations on this basic technique are possible, including solo aid climbing and climbing with a team of three or more.

Until the 1940s protection was provided by the piton, driven into a crack in the rock with a hammer and stoppers. Today, aid climbing uses a considerably larger array of hardware than the pitons used by the first climbers although the primary technique of ascension has not much evolved. The typical gear of an aid climber includes pitons, hooks, copperheads, nuts, camming devices, ascenders, hauling pulleys, aiders, daisy chains, and wall hammers. The invention of camming devices or "friends" and other non-damaging rock gear has resulted in the practice of clean aid, where nothing is hammered, a great bonus for popular routes which could be disfigured from continual hammering.

The hardest aid routes are poorly protected, requiring the climber to make long sequences of moves using hooks or tenuous placements. On these routes, a climber may have to commit to moving up onto the most marginal of placements risking long and sometimes dangerous falls. By contrast, the vast majority of aid ascents are done on popular free climbs which are too difficult for the aid party to free, but offer excellent gear placements.  Since aid climbing is extremely slow compared to free climbing, this can lead to some conflicts between aid climbers and free climbers waiting to climb a route.  There is additional tension caused by the damage that aid climbing often does to routes.  Hooks frequently break or otherwise damage holds that human hands and feet do not.  New aid climbers also often compulsively "bounce test" pieces the reliability of which experienced leaders can often assess at a glance; removing a "bounce-tested" nut often requires hammer blows which further expand and sometimes fracture holds.

History

Until the 1960s or so, aid climbing was normal practice in most climbing areas. But as improvements in technique and equipment meant that many aid routes could be climbed free, some influential climbers began to criticise the use of aid as being against the spirit of mountaineering. Reinhold Messner wrote, "Rock faces are no longer overcome by climbing skill, but are humbled, pitch by pitch, by methodical manual labour ... Who has polluted the pure spring of mountaineering?" (from "The Murder of the Impossible").

Free climbing is now the mainstream of climbing. But aid climbers have answered the criticism of Messner and others by climbing routes where the absence of holds or features in the rock make free climbing impossible, and by avoiding purely mechanical techniques (such as repetitively drilling bolts).

Today, many routes which were originally done using aid are being climbed free by a new generation of climbers with immensely improved skill, physical ability, and significantly advanced equipment including modern ropes, high-friction rubber shoes, and modern camming devices. Some of the techniques used to achieve free ascents of aid routes, for example placing extra bolts for protection (retro-bolting), are now sometimes thought to have "polluted the pure spring of mountaineering" by destroying the route as it was climbed by the first ascensionists. The solution is often a compromise in which an absolute minimum of bolts is added to allow safe protection for free climbers, while not totally destroying the challenge of the route as an aid climb. However, as with most compromises, this is not a solution that satisfies everyone.

Grading

The A grading scale (A for 'artificial' or 'aid') incorporates difficulty of placing protection, and the danger associated with falling. The original scale was a closed gradation scale from A0 to A6, modern aid climbers have adopted "new wave" grading which compresses the scale but still uses A0–A5.  A parallel scale of C0–C5 has been used to describe routes which can be climbed clean.  Clean in this context refers to routes that can be completed without a hammer and the associated pitons even if the route still uses previously installed expansion bolts.  
 
A0  Pulling on solid protection, often without the use of étriers.
A1  Easy aid, no risk of any piece of protection pulling out. Safe falls.
A2  Moderate aid. Short sections of tenuous placements above good protection.
A2+ May include easier A3 moves but is not hard enough to be rated as such.
A3  Hard aid. Involves many tenuous placements in a row. 
A3+ May include easier A4 moves but is not hard enough to be rated as such.
A4  Runout, complex and time-consuming. Many body weight placements.
A4+ May include easier A5 moves but is not hard enough to be rated as such.
A5  Serious, hard aid with huge falls and possibly lethal results.
A6 psycho aid, all placements body weight only including the belay anchor.

Literature
Long, John and John Middendorf, Big Walls, Chockstone Press, Evergreen, Colorado, 1994. 
McNamara, Chris, "How to Big Wall Climb", Supertopo, South Lake Tahoe, California, 2013.

References

Types of climbing
Types of Mountaineering